The Manol River is a river in Alt Empordà, Catalonia, Spain. It is a seasonal river, and a tributary of the Muga. An emblematic bird of the river is the European bee-eater (Merops apiaster), a migratory bird that overwinters in tropical Africa.

Course
The rivers begins near Albanyà at 1,089 m a.s.l., and flows through the municipalities of Cabanelles, Lladó, Navata, Avinyonet de Puigventós, Vilafant, Santa Llogaia d'Àlguema, Figueres, El Far d'Empordà, Vila-sacra, and Vilanova de la Muga (ca). At Vilanova de la Muga the river joins the Muga River that continues to the Mediterranean Sea.

See also 
 List of rivers of Spain

References

Rivers of Spain
Drainage basins of the Mediterranean Sea
Rivers of Catalonia